The .327 Federal Magnum is a cartridge introduced by Federal Premium Ammunition and also sold by Sturm, Ruger & Co. It is intended to provide the power of a .357 Magnum in six-shot, compact revolvers, whose cylinders would otherwise only hold five rounds. The .327 has also been used in full-sized revolvers with a capacity of seven rounds or more.

Development
Introduced by the Federal Cartridge company, now known as Federal Premium Ammunition, the .327 Federal Magnum was an attempt to improve on the .32 H&R Magnum introduced in 1984. Like the .32 H&R, the .327 Federal is a lengthened version of the original .32 S&W cartridge, which dates back to 1878. In 1896, the .32 S&W Long was introduced, which generated slightly higher velocities.

Based on the .32 H&R Magnum, with a 1/8-inch longer case, a strengthened web at the base of the case, thicker case walls, and different heat-treatment and metallurgy, the .327 Federal can be loaded to much higher pressure levels than its predecessor (21,000 CUP).

While perceived recoil exceeds that of the .32 H&R, revolvers in .327 Federal are much easier to control than equivalent models chambered in .357 Magnum. Comparing the two calibers, Chuck Hawks says, "There is no doubt that, for most shooters, the .357 Magnum produces uncomfortable recoil and muzzle blast."

Firearms chambered for the .327 Federal Magnum
Revolvers in .327 Federal Magnum were initially offered by Charter Arms, Taurus, Ruger, and Freedom Arms, with Ruger's SP101 originally selected as the development platform for the new cartridge. Freedom Arms made a single-action design, as did U.S. Fire Arms with its eight-shot Sparrowhawk. Ruger offered the double-action six-shot SP101 and seven-shot GP100, and the full-sized single-action eight-shot Blackhawk chambered in the caliber. A version of the Ruger SP101 with a 3 1/16" barrel was released in January 2008.

In late 2014, Ruger introduced the smaller-framed Ruger Single-Seven, a seven-shot single-action revolver based on the Single-Six. In March 2015, Ruger re-introduced the SP101 in .327 Federal Magnum, featuring fully adjustable sights and a longer,  barrel. In September 2015, Ruger also introduced the LCR, a double-action only, six-shot revolver with a polymer subframe, as well as the later LCRx.

In early 2017, Henry Repeating Arms announced production of four new lever-action long guns (a rifle and a carbine, each available with its receiver manufactured from either steel or hardened brass), with shipping scheduled to begin in March. Hawks suggests that lever-action carbines in .327 Magnum will make "excellent, fun to shoot centerfire rifles for hunting javelina, jackrabbit, and coyote"; he also notes that revolvers with six-to-eight-inch barrels and adjustable sights "would be excellent hunting handguns for varmints and small predators, as well as offering flat-shooting protection from two-legged predators in the field."

In early 2022, Taurus released the Taurus 327 small frame revolver.

Similar cartridges

The .327 Federal Magnum provides performance similar to the high-velocity rifle loadings of the old .32-20 Winchester, though these velocities are achieved in a much shorter revolver barrel, thanks to a much higher pressure ceiling for the .327.

Another similar cartridge is the .30 Carbine, which has been offered in Ruger's single-action Blackhawk revolver line since 1968. However, the .327 Federal Magnum has a higher maximum pressure (45,000 psi) than the .30 Carbine (40,000 psi).

Gunsmiths working with Ruger and Freedom Arms have offered custom conversions of single-action .32 H&R Single Six and Freedom Arms revolvers to .327 Federal. Test results from the long barreled guns showed even higher velocities than the .30 Carbine, along with excellent accuracy.

See also
List of handgun cartridges
Table of handgun and rifle cartridges
8 mm caliber
Super magnum

References

External links
 Ruger Blackhawk .327 Federal 5.5" 8-shot Revolver
Ballistics By The Inch .327 Federal Magnum Results.

.327 Federal Magnum firearms
Sturm, Ruger & Company
Pistol and rifle cartridges
Magnum pistol cartridges